Phostria fumarialis is a moth in the family Crambidae. It was described by Hermann Dewitz in 1881. It is found in Angola.

References

Phostria
Moths described in 1881
Moths of Africa